The Coupe de France's results of the 1967–68 season. AS Saint-Étienne won the final played on May 12, 1968, beating Girondins de Bordeaux.

Round of 16

Quarter-finals

Semi-finals

Replay

Final

References

French federation

1967–68 domestic association football cups
1967–68 in French football
1967-68